Quimperlé is a railway station in Quimperlé, Brittany, France. The station was opened on 7 September 1863, and is located on the Savenay–Landerneau railway. Today, the station is served by TGV (high speed), Intercités (long distance) and TER Bretagne services operated by the SNCF.

Train services

The station is served by high speed trains to Quimper and Paris, and regional trains to Quimper, Lorient, Nantes and Rennes.

References

Railway stations in Finistère
TER Bretagne
Railway stations in France opened in 1863